Faculdade de Engenharia de Sorocaba (FACENS)

The Sorocaba Engineering School (FACENS) is the first higher education institution of the sector founded in Sorocaba. Maintained by the Sorocaba Cultural Association for Technological Renovation (ACRTS), it is considered to be a nonprofit and philanthropic Federal Organization certified by the National Welfare Council. Subsequently, it offers numerous grants to students who have socio-economic needs. The organization also invests all of its profits in the College, making FACENS an educational center that is growing constantly.

It currently offers eight courses: Civil, Electrical, Mechanical, Computer, Mechatronics, Chemistry, Production Engineering and Technology in Digital Gaming, as well as graduate courses and specializations.
Its level of education is recognized throughout the job market, generating extremely high percentages of graduate employability (average of 94% over the past eight years).
FACENS has outstanding professional and academic faculty as well as a great infrastructure, supported by well-equipped and technologically advanced labs.
These are decisive factors for the recognition of the educational programs the College develops, and, more specifically, for the quality of professionals who graduate here.

Address
Rodovia Senador José Ermírio de Moraes, 1425,  Castelinho km 1,5 - Alto da Boa Vista - SOROCABA/SP - CEP 18087-125

External links
FACENS (Portuguese)

Universities and colleges in São Paulo (state)
Educational institutions established in 1978
1978 establishments in Brazil